Vincenzo Amato (6 January 1629, Ciminna near Palermo – 29 July 1670, Palermo) was an Italian composer of the Baroque.

Works 
 Sacri concerti a 2, 3, 4 e 5 voci, con una messa a 3 e a 4 voci. Libro I. Opera I. (1656)
 Messa e salmi di Vespro e Compieta a 4 e 5 voci. Libro I. Op. II. (1656)
 A St John and a St Matthew Passion, in parts still sung in Sicilian churches

1629 births
1670 deaths
Italian Baroque composers